Vladimir Popović Lukin (27 January 1914 – 1 April 1972) was a Yugoslav diplomat, communist politician and army general. He was a close associate of Josip Broz Tito. He was, during his career, a delegate to the UN, close associate of Josip Broz Tito, Yugoslavia's envoy (ambassador) to the USSR, US, China, and Vietnam, member of the federal government of Yugoslavia, and chair of the Committee for Foreign Affairs of the Federal Assembly of Yugoslavia, and secretary to the presidency until his death in 1972.

Biography
Popović was born in 1914 in Gornji Brčeli, near Bar, Kingdom of Montenegro. In 1932, he joined the Yugoslav Communist Party. From 1934 to 1937, he attended the NKVD School in Leningrad under the nickname of "Španac" (Spaniard) where he learned English, German, and Spanish language and diplomat protocols. In 1937 he graduated from the University of Belgrade's School of Medicine.
 

 

That same year, he represented his fellow students at the World Youth Congress in Paris where he met Josip Broz Tito, then Secretary of the Yugoslav Communist Party. He then joined the Spanish Civil War, reaching the rank of Captain in the Spanish Republican Army. After the Invasion of Yugoslavia in 1941 by the Axis powers, he became a leader of the Yugoslav Partisans forces in Croatia. In 1944, he advanced to the rank of major general, commanding the Partisan Third Army Corps in Bosnia. 

After the end of the war, Tito sent him to Bulgaria as the Yugoslav military and political representative. In 1945, he was named Yugoslavia's first Communist Ambassador to the Soviet Union. In 1946, he was a member of the Yugoslav delegation to the United Nations and part of the Yugoslav Delegation at the Paris Peace conference in Versailles (21 delegations from countries in the Second World War with Germany).

From 1946 to 1947 he was in Mosco, where he helped negotiate economic-cooperation agreements with the Soviet Union. In 1948, the Cominform (an organization 1947–56 established by the Communist parties of nine European countries for mutual advice and coordinated activity) denounced the Yugoslav Communist Party and the Soviet Union imposed an economic blockade on Yugoslavia. He would then become First Deputy Minister of Foreign Affairs and was elected to the Central Committee of the Yugoslav Communist party.

In 1949 he served as chief of the Yugoslav Delegation to the United Nations General Assembly where he sought the aid of Western powers for his country. In 1950, he was named as Ambassador to the United States and pledged a policy of peaceful cooperation. He was influential in obtaining $38 million in food and supplies for his drought–stricken country. He helped obtain $50 million in economic aid from the United States, Britain and France, which was secured after the release of archbishop Aloysius Stepinac. In 1954 he was Chairman of the foreign affairs committee of the Federal People's Assembly of Yugoslavia. From 1955 to 1958, he served as ambassador to China, USA and Vietnam. From 1958 to 1972, he held several different positions. He was a member of the presidium of the Central Committee in charge of Foreign Policy, a member of the Federal Government, the Chairman of the Committee for foreign economic relations, head of goodwill trade missions to Latin America, on missions to members of The Non-Aligned Movement NAM and Secretary to the Presidency until his death 1972 in London.

He married Vjera Radimir in 1946.

Literature 
Dedijer Vladimir (1953). Tito. Publisher: Simon and Schuster
Dedijer, Vladimir (1953). Tito Speaks: His Self Portrait and Struggle with Stalin. Weidenfeld and Nicolson.
Lees, Lorraine M. (2006). Keeping Tito Afloat: The United States, Yugoslavia, and the Cold War. Pennsylvania State University Press.
Velebit, Vladimir Sjecanja, Zagreb, 1983.
Ivan Matovic: "Crnogorci Nadzivjeli Spansku Golgotu"
Balen, Marija-Vica: Bili smo idealisti. Uspomene jedne revolucionarke. Zagreb, 2009.
Biografija izdanja u Narodnooslobodilačkom ratu 1941–1945. Beograd, 1964.
Bojović, Jovan: Osma pokrajinska konferencija KPJ za Crnu Goru, Boku, Sandžak, Kosovo i Metohiju. Titograd, 1980.
Cenčić, Vjenceslav: Enigma Kopinič I-II. Beograd 1983.
Četiri decenije Saveza komunista Hrvatske. Zbornik, Zagreb, 1979.
Damjanović, Milica: Napredni pokret studenata Beogradskog univerziteta, Beograd, 1974.
Damjanović, Pero: Tito pred temama istorije. Beograd, 1977.
Damjanović, Pero: Tito na čelu Partije. Beograd, 1968.
Dedijer, Vladimir: Dnevnik. Beograd, 1951.
Dedijer, Vladimir: Novi prilozi za biografiju Josipa Broza Tita. Beograd
Đilas, Milovan: Vlast i pobuna. Memoari. Zagreb, 2009.
Đurić, Ljubomir: 1941–42. Beograd 1975.
Đuričković, Boško: Sjećanje na akcije iz studentskih dana. Nikšić, 1986.
Dokumenti centralnih organa KPJ, NOR i revolucije 1941–1945. Beograd, 1987.
Državna potpuna realna gimnazija u Nikšiću. Izvještaj za školsku 1939–40 godinu. Nikšić
Godišnjak Cetinjske gimnazije 1970.
Godišnjak muzeja grada Beograda, 1956.
Hronologija oslobodilačke borbe naroda Jugoslavije 1941–1945. Beograd, 1964.
Istorija radničkog pokreta . Zbornik, Beograd, 1965.
Istorija Saveza komunista Jugoslavije
Jelić, Ivan: Tragedija u Kerestincu, Zagrebačko ljeto 1941, Zagreb, 1986.
Jugoslavija i svet. Beograd, za 1965–1972.
Kardelj, Edvard: Borba za priznavanje i nezavisnost nove Jugoslavije... Sećanja. Ljubljana 1980.
Komunistički pokret i socijalistička revolucija u Hrvatskoj. Zagreb, 1969.
Lees, Lorraine: Keeping Tito Afloat – the United States Yugoslavia, and the Cold war, 1997.
Marović, Miodrag-Mališa: Veljko Milatović, Podgorica 2006.
Medaković, Dejan: Efemeris III. Hronika jedne porodice. Beograd
Miljanić, Gojko: Kadrovi revolucije 1941–1945, Cetinje, 1975.
Morača Pero, Stojanović Stanislav: Komunisti Jugoslavije 1919–1979. Beograd, 1979.
Narodni heroji Jugoslavije, 1975.
Petričević, J.: Ivo Lola Ribar. Zagreb, 1964.
Ribnikar, Jara: Kuća koja je postala muzej. Beograd, 1964.
Ridli, Džasper: Tito. Novi Sad, 1998.
Simić, Pero: Tito. Tajna veka. Beograd, 2009.
Sjevernozapadna Hrvatska u NOB – u i socijalističkoj revoluciji. Zbornik. Varaždin, 1976.
Španija 1936 – 1939. Zbornik I –VI.  Beograd  1971.
Udovički, Lazar: O Španiji i španskim borcima (članci, intervjui, pisma, govori, izvještaji), Beograd,
Vukmanović, Svetozar – Tempo: Revolucija koja teče. Memoari.
Vasić, Miroljub: Revolucionarni omladinski pokret u Jugoslaviji 1929–1941. godine. Beograd, 1977.
Vladimir Velebit svjedok istorije, razgovore vodila i priredila Mira Šuvar. Zagreb, 2001.
Vrhunec, Marko: Šest godina sa Titom, Beograd. Vujošević, Ubavka: Tito i Beograd. Beograd 1977.
Vukmanović, Gojko: Vladimir Popović, feljton u Pobjedi od 1. aprila do 5. maja 1984.
Zagreb 1941–1945, Zbornik sjećanja, I-IV. Zagreb, 1984.
Zbornik instituta za istoriju radničkog pokreta Dalmacije. 1975
Članci u jugoslovenskim novinama, časopisima i revijama:Borba, Politika, Pobjeda, Vjesnik, Delo, Oslobođenje, Barske novine, Zagrebačka panorama, NIN. Istorijski zapisi, Ovdje, Vojno istorijski glasnik
Ivo i Slavko Goldstein, "Tito" (Profil, Zagreb, 2015.

References

External links 
 NY Times

1914 births
1972 deaths
People from Bar, Montenegro
People of the Kingdom of Montenegro
Yugoslav politicians
Yugoslav communists
Yugoslav diplomats
Yugoslav Partisans members
Yugoslav military personnel of World War II
Yugoslavia in World War II
Yugoslav people of the Spanish Civil War
Generals of the Yugoslav People's Army
University of Belgrade Faculty of Medicine alumni
Recipients of the Order of the People's Hero